HMS Tirade was a Modified Admiralty  destroyer which served with the Royal Navy during World War I. The Modified R class added attributes of the Yarrow Later M class to improve the capability of the ships to operate in bad weather. Launched in April 1917 by Scotts Shipbuilding and Engineering Company, the vessel served with the Grand Fleet. The vessel was involved in escorting convoys in the Irish Sea and North Sea. During one of these duties, in September 1917, Tirade sank the minelaying submarine UC-55. During the following month, the destroyer accidentally struck and sank the M-class destroyer . After the war the destroyer was placed in reserve and then, in November 1921, was sold to be broken up.

Design and development

Tirade was one of eleven Modified  destroyers ordered by the British Admiralty in March 1916 as part of the Eighth War Construction Programme. The design was a development of the existing R class, adding features from the Yarrow Later M class which had been introduced based on wartime experience. The forward two boilers were transposed and vented through a single funnel, enabling the bridge and forward gun to be placed further aft. Combined with hull-strengthening, this improved the destroyers' ability to operate at high speed in bad weather.
s
Two funnels were fitted.

Armament consisted of three single QF  Mk IV guns on the ship's centreline, with one on the forecastle, one aft on a raised platform and one between the funnels. A single 2-pounder  "pom-pom" anti-aircraft gun was carried on a platform between two twin mounts for  torpedoes. The destroyer was subsequently equipped with the ability to drop depth charges. The ship had a complement of 82 officers and ratings.

Construction and career
Laid down by Scotts at Greenock on 1 May 1916 with the yard number 478, Tirade was launched on 21 April 1917. The vessel was completed on 30 June. On commissioning, Tirade joined the Fifteenth Destroyer Flotilla of the Grand Fleet.

Tirade initially served from Lough Swilly, Ireland, on convoy escort duty in the Irish Sea. On 28 July 1917, the destroyer was escorting a convoy of three oilers when the submarine U-61 attacked, but all the ships were able to reach Lough Swilly. The destroyer first saw action alongside Thornycroft M-class destroyer  in August 1917 when the vessel unsuccessfully attacked a fleeing submarine with depth charges. Tirade relocated to Scapa Flow to escort convoys travelling in the North Sea between the United Kingdom and Norway.

On 29 September, the armed trawler HMT Moravia identified the submarine minelayer UC-55 surfaced, suffering from a lack of rudder control and failing batteries, and attempting to scuttle. The third shell struck the submarine's conning tower, killing the commander, and the fifth holed the hull below the waterline. The destroyer delivered the coup de grace with two depth charges, which blew up the submarine. Tirade rescued two of the nineteen survivors from the water. On 21 October, the destroyer accidentally collided with the Admiralty M-class destroyer  while escorting a convoy off Lerwick. Tirade received little damage but Marmion foundered and sank.

At the end of World War I, Tirade was still part of the  Fifteenth Destroyer Flotilla under the flotilla leader . The vessel was transferred to the 5th Destroyer Flotilla under the flag of  when the Home Fleet was formed, but was transferred to the Reserve Fleet at the Nore on 28 November 1919. However, the Royal Navy needed to reduce both the number of ships and the amount of personnel to save money. The destroyer spent less than two years in reserve before being sold to Cashmore of Newport, Wales, on 15 November 1921 and broken up.

Pennant numbers

References

Citations

Bibliography

 
 
 
 
 
 
 
 
 
 
 

1917 ships
R-class destroyers (1916)
Ships built on the River Clyde
World War I destroyers of the United Kingdom